Balasingham Nadesan (Tamil:பாலசிங்கம் நடேசன்) was the Political Chief of the Liberation Tigers of Tamil Eelam (LTTE) from late 2007 until his death in 2009. He was formerly the organization's Chief of Police.

Personal life

Balasingham Nadesan married a Sinhalese woman "Vineetha Samarasinghe Gunasekara" when he was a policeman for the Sri Lankan Government in Colombo. He left the Sri Lankan Police and joined the LTTE, becoming the head of the organization's police force after the Black July riots in 1983 in Colombo.

Career

As police chief, Nadesan oversaw the building of new police stations in the East following the 2002 Ceasefire Agreement brokered by Norway. He also accompanied numerous delegations of the LTTE overseas. In November 2007, he became the head of the political division after S. P. Thamilselvan was killed in an air strike by Sri Lankan Air Force.

Death

Nadesan was killed on 18 May 2009 when the Sri Lankan Army overcame the final stronghold of the Tamil Tigers. It is alleged that Nadesan and his family were executed by the Sri Lankan Army after agreement to surrender during the White Flag incident that came to recognition on international terms.

See also

Liberation Tigers of Tamil Eelam

References

2009 deaths
Liberation Tigers of Tamil Eelam members
Sri Lankan Tamil rebels
Sri Lankan rebels
Year of birth missing